The Women's 200 metre freestyle competition of the swimming events at the 2015 World Aquatics Championships was held on 4 August with the heats and the semifinals and 5 August with the final.

Records
Prior to the competition, the existing world and championship records were as follows.

Results

Heats
The heats were held at 09:49.

Semifinals
The semifinals were held on 4 August at 18:44.

Semifinal 1

Semifinal 2

Final
The final was held at 18:01.

References

Women's 200 metre freestyle
2015 in women's swimming